The 2008 East–West Shrine Game was the 83rd staging of the all-star college football exhibition game featuring NCAA Division I Football Bowl Subdivision players. The game featured over 100 players from the 2007 college football season, and prospects for the 2008 Draft of the professional National Football League (NFL). In the week prior to the game, scouts from all 32 NFL teams attended. The proceeds from the East–West Shrine Game benefit Shriners Hospitals for Children.

The game was played on January 19, 2008, at 6 p.m. CT at Robertson Stadium on the campus of the University of Houston, and was televised by ESPN2.

The offensive MVP was Josh Johnson (QB, San Diego), while the defensive MVP was Spencer Larsen (LB, Arizona). The Pat Tillman Award was presented to Justin Tryon (DB, Arizona State); the award "is presented to a player who best exemplifies character, intelligence, sportsmanship and service".

Scoring summary 

Sources:

Statistics 

Source:

Coaching staff 
East head coach: Dick Vermeil

West head coach: Mike White

Source:

2008 NFL Draft

References

Further reading 
 
 

East-West Shrine Game
East–West Shrine Bowl
American football competitions in Houston
January 2008 sports events in the United States
East-West Shrine Game
2008 in Houston